Chicago Fire is an American drama television series created by Michael Brandt and Derek Haas, with Dick Wolf as an executive producer. It is the first installment of Wolf Entertainment's Chicago franchise, which deals with different public services in Chicago, Illinois. Chicago Fire follows the professional and personal lives of firefighters, rescue personnel, and paramedics of the Chicago Fire Department at the fictional Firehouse 51. The series premiered on NBC on October 10, 2012. , the series had 229 episodes. On February 27, 2020, NBC renewed the series for its ninth, tenth, and eleventh season. The tenth season premiered on September 22, 2021. The eleventh season premiered on September 21, 2022.

Plot
The show explores the lives, both professional and personal, of the firefighters, rescue personnel, and paramedics of the Chicago Fire Department at the fictional Firehouse 51, home of the fictional Engine Company 51, Truck Company 81, Rescue Squad Company 3, Battalion 25, and Ambulance 61. Following the death of veteran firefighter Andrew Darden, loyalties fracture and divide as Lieutenant Matthew Casey, officer-in-charge of Truck Company 81, and Lieutenant Kelly Severide, officer-in-charge of Rescue Squad Company 3, blame each other for the death of their long-time friend and colleague. They are led by the heroic and determined Deputy District Chief Wallace Boden.

Cast

Main
 Jesse Spencer as Lieutenant Matthew Casey, Truck Company 81 (seasons 1–10) Casey is the Lieutenant at Firehouse 51 and the officer in charge of Truck Company 81. He serves as second in command to Battalion Chief Wallace Boden. A skilled handyman and carpenter, he freelances as a construction contractor when off-duty. He is civic-minded and becomes an elected Alderman to further serve the city. Despite his reticence and aloof demeanor, he is fiercely protective of the firefighters under him and commands their loyalty and respect. He was briefly engaged to Dr. Hallie Thomas in season one and from seasons five to seven, was married to Gabriela Dawson. In the sixth-season episode "An Even Bigger Surprise", he is promoted to Captain by Chief Boden. In the ninth-season finale "No Survivors", he begins dating paramedic Sylvie Brett. In the tenth-season episode “Two Hundred”, Casey moves to Oregon to take care of Andrew Darden's sons, but maintained a long-distance relationship with Brett. He later returns in the season finale to attend Severide and Kidd's wedding. In the eleventh season premiere Brett breaks up with him feeling that they had grown apart by the distance.
 Taylor Kinney as Lieutenant Kelly Severide, Rescue Squad 3. Severide is the Lieutenant at Firehouse 51 and the officer in charge of Squad 3. As Lieutenant, he serves as third in command to Battalion Chief Wallace Boden. In contrast to Casey, he is charismatic and portrayed to be something of a "ladies' man". He and Casey have been friends since their days at the CFD Academy, but their friendship becomes strained after a mutual colleague dies on the job. His father was Chief Benny Severide, a long-time friend of Chief Boden and Henry Mills, father of Candidate Peter Mills. In the season 4 finale, "Superhero", he begins dating Stella Kidd. In the season 9 episode "A White-Knuckle Panic", they become engaged. In the season 10 episode "The Magnificent City of Chicago, they get married.
 Monica Raymund as Paramedic in Charge Gabriela "Gabby" Dawson, Ambulance 61 (seasons 1–6; guest seasons 7–8). She is the younger sister of Chicago P.D. and Chicago Justice character Detective Antonio Dawson. Dawson is one of the few women in 51 and is usually treated as a sister by the men. She is the Paramedic in Charge (PIC) of Ambulance 61 but goes to the fire academy and passes the training to become a firefighter and joins Truck 81. She later transfers back to Ambulance 61 to provide cover for Jimmy Borelli when he transfers back to Truck 81 and after becoming a foster parent has become more concerned about the dangers of the job. In season one, she briefly dates Peter Mills. From seasons five to seven, she was married to Matt Casey. After the sixth-season finale "The Grand Gesture", she left Chicago to head a rescue-and-relief unit in Puerto Rico, but briefly returned to say goodbye to Casey in the seventh-season premiere "A Closer Eye" and again for a charity ball in the eighth-season episode "Best Friend Magic".
 Lauren German as Paramedic Leslie Elizabeth Shay, Ambulance 61 (seasons 1–2; guest, season 3). As an experienced paramedic, Shay was the designated ambulance driver and was well-liked by the mostly male crew of 51. She and Kelly Severide shared an apartment as roommates and were best friends. Popular with her co-workers, she was openly gay, often cracking self-deprecating jokes about it. In the third-season premiere "Always", she was killed in its continuation of the second-season finale "Real Never Waits" cliffhanger, in which a serial arsonist intentionally set a trap for the first responders. In "Three Bells", she was honored and remembered by her fellow co-workers at 51. She is memorialized by an inscription painted on the cab door of Ambulance 61.
 Charlie Barnett as Firefighter Candidate Peter Mills and later Truck 81, Squad 3, Ambulance 61 (seasons 1–3). Mills begins as a candidate on Truck 81, following in his deceased father's footsteps, but after proving his capabilities as a firefighter, he earns a spot on Squad 3. After losing his firefighter certification due to injury, he transfers to Ambulance 61 to keep working. He eventually recovers and earns his spot back on the squad but chose to leave Chicago in "You Know Where to Find Me" to work with his family in North Carolina. He briefly dates Gabriela Dawson in season one.
 David Eigenberg as Senior Firefighter Christopher Herrmann, Engine 51, previously Truck 81: One of the senior firefighters at 51, he serves on Truck 81 before he passes the Lieutenant exam, after five previous attempts, and is officially promoted to Lieutenant in the seventh season episode "Thirty Percent Sleight of Hand" and takes over as officer in charge of Engine Company 51. As Lieutenant, he serves as fourth in command to Battalion Chief Wallace Boden. A father figure to the firehouse, the men and women often come to him for advice. He engages in many get rich quick schemes before he, Otis and Dawson jointly invest in a small bar one of their victims had been trying to sell, which they call Molly's. Molly's is also featured on Chicago P.D. and Chicago Med as a favorite hangout of cops and medical personnel.
 Eamonn Walker as Battalion Chief , Battalion 25. He oversees the firefighters and paramedics of Truck 81, Engine 51, Squad 3 and Ambulance 61 at Firehouse 51. A long-time veteran of the CFD, he is extremely protective of the men and women who serve under him, even putting his career on the line several times to help them. He is married to Donna, who is a teacher and they have a son name Terrance, who was born in season 3. In season 10, he is promoted to Deputy District Chief.
 Yuri Sardarov as Firefighter , Truck 81 (recurring season 1; seasons 2–8). Prior to Mills' assignment in the pilot, Otis was the latest candidate to be assigned to 81. He was routinely assigned to work elevators, and his nickname "Otis" came from the Otis Elevator Company. He became the driver after Joe Cruz transferred to Squad 3. In the season eight premiere, "Sacred Ground", he was fatally wounded (continuing from the season seven finale, "I'm Not Leaving You", cliff-hanger) and dies with Cruz by his side in the hospital.
 Christian Stolte as Senior Firefighter Randall "Mouch" McHolland, Truck 81 (recurring season 1; season 2–present). Another of 51's senior firefighters, Mouch is the de facto "legal advisor" of 51 and is their union representative. His nickname is a portmanteau of "man" and "couch" since he is almost always seen sitting on the couch in the lounge watching TV when not on a call. In the fourth-season episode "On The Warpath", he marries Chicago P.D. character Sergeant Trudy Platt.
 Joe Minoso as Firefighter , Squad 3 (recurring season 1; main season 2–present). A native of the gangster-infested neighborhoods of Humboldt Park, he spends the first two seasons constantly trying to bail his wayward younger brother out of trouble. In the third-season finale, "Spartacus", he transfers to Squad 3. In season three, he briefly dates Sylvie Brett. In the eighth-season episode "Light Things Up", he marries Chloe Allen. He was formerly the designated driver for Truck 81 before his transfer to Squad 3. In season 10, episode 200, his son is born, and they name him Brian "Otis" Leon Cruz.
 Teri Reeves as Dr. Hallie Thomas (season 1). Matt Casey's ex-fiancée. They broke up due to differing views, her hectic schedule and his irregular hours which prevented them from spending much time together, but they remained friends. They briefly rekindled their relationship until she was murdered in a fire as part of a cover-up after she discovered that one of her colleagues at her clinic was selling medication to drug dealers.
 Kara Killmer as Paramedic Sylvie Brett, Ambulance 61 (season 3–present). Sylvie is a paramedic who joins Ambulance 61 in season three, replacing Leslie Shay after her death. She is a small-town girl from Fowlerton, Indiana, and is a "runaway bride" who goes up I-65 to Chicago. Initially, she has difficulty adjusting to city life due to her naiveté, as shown by the fact that she leaves cash out on the table with the windows open and rented an apartment in a neighborhood known for crime because the rent was cheap. She briefly dates Joe Cruz in season three and shares an apartment with Dawson prior to the latter's marriage to Casey. After her third partner, Jessica Chilton, is fired, Sylvie is promoted to Paramedic in Charge (PIC) (season 4). She dates Dawson's brother Antonio on and off from seasons five to six and is also briefly engaged to Chaplain Kyle Sheffield from seasons seven to eight. In the ninth-season finale, "No Survivors", she begins dating Dawson's ex-husband Captain Matthew Casey, and in the tenth-season episode "Two Hundred", she begins a long-distance relationship with him when he moves to Oregon, which she later ends in the eleventh-season premiere after feeling that they had grown apart by the distance.
 Dora Madison as Paramedic in Charge Jessica "Chili" Chilton (recurring season 3; main season 4). She was brought in to replace Peter Mills as the new Paramedic in Charge (PIC). Her arrival is initially met with some frostiness from the rest of the crew since they were still getting over Mills' sudden departure. She was previously with a firehouse in the West Side and is experienced in dealing with victims of major trauma. She briefly dates Jimmy Borelli in the fourth season. She is later fired by Chief Boden during the fourth season after the death of her sister causes her to nearly kill a patient by giving her the wrong medicine and later to relapse into alcoholism. After she is fired, she calls Kelly Severide for help and he takes her to an Alcoholics Anonymous meeting.
 Steven R. McQueen as Firefighter Candidate Jimmy Borrelli (seasons 4–5). He was introduced in the fourth-season premiere "Let It Burn" as the new candidate assigned to Truck 81. He briefly dates Jessica "Chilli" Chilton in the fourth season and also briefly replaces her as a paramedic on Ambulance 61 after she is fired. After his brother dies in a collapsed building, he blames Chief Boden and transfers back to Truck 81. He is critically injured by an explosion early in the fifth season that leaves him requiring round-the-clock care, thus ending his firefighting career.
 Miranda Rae Mayo as Firefighter Stella Kidd: Truck 81 (recurring season 4; main season 5–present). Jimmy Borelli's replacement on Truck 81. She briefly replaces Otis as driver in season six and permanently replaces him after his death in season eight. She is promoted to Lieutenant in the ninth-season episode "What Comes Next" after passing the exams. In the fourth-season finale, "Superhero", she begins dating Lieutenant Kelly Severide. In the ninth-season episode "A White-Knuckle Panic", they become engaged. In the last episode of tenth season, they get married.
 Annie Ilonzeh as Paramedic Emily Foster, Ambulance 61 (seasons 7–8). A former medical student who replaces Gabriela Dawson on Ambulance 61. In the eighth-season finale "51's Original Bell", she re-applies to medical school, and in the ninth-season premiere "Rattle Second City", Brett says that she was accepted back and is working in a COVID-19 ward.
 Alberto Rosende as Firefighter Candidate Blake Gallo, Truck 81 (seasons 8–present). Firehouse 51's latest recruit on Truck 81, replacing Brian "Otis" Zvonecek after his death. Gallo became a firefighter after he lost his entire family in a house fire.
 Daniel Kyri as Firefighter Candidate Darren Ritter, Engine 51 (recurring seasons 7–8; main season 9–present). After Herrmann forcibly transfers Firefighter Barns for his disrespect, Mouch suggests Ritter as a replacement. Previously with Engine 37, Mouch helped him when he froze up during a fire, and he ended up making his first save. He is openly gay, has a boyfriend named Eric, and is the owner of Tuesday the Dalmatian.
 Adriyan Rae as Paramedic Gianna Mackey, Ambulance 61 (season 9). Emily Foster's replacement on Ambulance 61. Gianna grew up in the same neighborhood as Joe Cruz, who recommended her for the job after Foster left and is very protective of her. She quickly makes a good impression on her co-workers and enters a casual relationship with Blake Gallo. In the ninth-season episode "Double Red", she transfers out of Firehouse 51 after being offered a spot at a new house for better advancement opportunities.
 Hanako Greensmith as Paramedic Violet Mikami (recurring season 8–9; main season 10–present). A paramedic from Firehouse 20 and Blake Gallo's old rival from the fire academy. She and Gallo briefly date in season eight. In season nine, Chief Boden asks her to temporarily transfer to Firehouse 51 to fill the spot on Ambulance 61 after Gianna Mackey leaves and Brett shortly convinces her to transfer to Firehouse 51 permanently.

Recurring
 Randy Flagler as Senior Firefighter Harold Capp: A member of Squad 3.
 Anthony Ferraris as Firefighter Tony Ferraris: A member of Squad 3. Anthony Ferraris is not just a fireman on the television series, but he also serves as an active firefighter in real life for the Chicago Fire Department. He has assisted in the production of the series by contributing his expertise from his numerous years of firefighting in order to bring the show a sense of realism.
 DuShon Monique Brown as Connie (seasons 1–6): Chief Wallace Boden's secretary.
 Mo Gallini as Firefighter Jose Vargas (season 1): A recent transfer to Squad 3 from Truck 81. A sixteen-year veteran, he is forced to retire after he is injured in a warehouse fire and considers suicide by jumping from his apartment building rooftop, but Severide and Casey talk him out of it.
 Shiri Appleby as Clarice Carthage (season 1): The pregnant ex-girlfriend of Leslie Shay, who briefly rekindles their relationship.
 Kathleen Quinlan as Nancy Casey (season 1): Matthew and Christie Casey's mother who was incarcerated for murdering their verbally abusive father and her husband Gregory in 1997, fifteen years prior to the beginning of the series. She has grown estranged from her children while in prison, but Casey is successful in getting Nancy released and she stays with him as part of her parole. However, things become tense when Casey voices his discomfort about her going out with a "penpal" just hours after being released and she moves in with her former cellmate, but not before telling her children to mend their relationship.
 Sarah Shahi as Renee Royce (seasons 1–2 and 6): A woman who becomes attracted to Kelly and briefly dated him after he saves her in a traffic accident.
 Treat Williams as Benjamin "Benny" Severide (seasons 1–7): Kelly's father, who served with Chief Boden and Peter Mills' father, Henry. He had a love-hate relationship with his son as he had left Kelly and his mother when he was ten years old. In the seventh-season episode "All The Proof", he suffers a stroke and dies.
 Alexandra Metz as Elise Mills (seasons 1–3): Peter Mills' sister. She helps run the family restaurant with her mom and is torn between being protective of Peter and encouraging him to follow his passion for public service.
 Robyn Coffin as Cindy Herrmann: Christopher Herrmann's wife, and mother of their five children.
 William Smillie as Firefighter Kevin Hadley (seasons 1–3): A member of Squad 3 who is transferred after playing an inappropriate prank on and making a racially insensitive slur against Peter Mills. He later becomes an arsonist, targeting his old firehouse and Mills and Severide in particular, whom he blames for his transfer and inability to find a permanent house since. He is eventually stopped and severely burned by his own materials, and is arrested and sent to prison for his crimes. Hadley later resurfaces to give Severide information on the arsonist responsible for the deaths of Mills' father, Henry, and paramedic Leslie Shay.
 Christine Evangelista as Paramedic-in-Charge Allison Rafferty, Ambulance 61 (season 2): Dawson's replacement on 61 after she starts training at the academy to become a firefighter.
 Brittany Curran as Katie Nolan (seasons 2 and 7): Benny Severide's daughter, and Kelly's half-sister.
 Michelle Forbes as Gail McLeod (season 2): A financial consultant hired by the state to help trim the budget of the CFD, which includes closing firehouses.
 John Hoogenakker as Lieutenant Spellman (season 2): A firefighter assigned to Firehouse 51, along with Clarke, after city budget cuts force the downsizing of the department. He is eventually outed as Gail McLeod's mole and forced to transfer out of the firehouse.
 Melissa Ponzio as Donna Boden (season 2–present): A schoolteacher whom Chief Boden falls for and eventually marries. She is the mother of his son, Terrance.
 Jeff Hephner as Lieutenant Jeff Clarke (seasons 2 and 5): A former Marine turned firefighter. After his firehouse is closed, he is transferred to Squad 3. He is initially not well-liked by the rest of the crew since he is extremely private and prefers to read newspapers at the squad's table rather than socialize with them in the lounge. Additionally, his arrival at Firehouse 51 coincides with McLeod's efforts to close it, and he is accused of being her mole. After getting injured on the job, he quits the CFD and starts as a medical student at Chicago Med.
 Edwin Hodge as Firefighter Rick Newhouse, Squad 3 (season 3): A transfer from the fictional Squad 6. His experience and charismatic personality quickly wins over Severide and the rest of the men, although Herrmann initially antagonized him as he had yet to come to terms with the recent suicide of Candidate Rebecca Jones. When off duty, he moonlights as a skiptracer and entertains his coworkers with stories of his "clientele".
 Warren Christie as Firefighter Scott Rice, Squad 3 (season 3): An old friend of Severide's whom he brings on to replace Newhouse following his transfer. He soon forms a rift between both Squad and Truck after the latter suspects him of ducking fires. After it is confirmed, he admits to being afraid of orphaning his son and is let go from 51.
 Gordon Clapp as Chaplain Orlovsky (seasons 3–6): A CFD Chaplain who offers spiritual advice and therapy
 Brian J. White as Captain Dallas Patterson, Squad 3 (season 4): A new captain brought in to replace Severide after a review board found the turnover rate for Squad 3 too high under his leadership. He later transfers out after rebelling against the corrupt Deputy Chief Riddle who had been hoping to use him to oust Boden as Battalion Chief.
 Michael Cognata as Julian Robbins (season 6–present): Chief Boden's brother-in-law.
 Damon Dayoub as Firefighter Jake Cordova (season 6): A confident, rugged firefighter who is assigned to Truck 81 as a temporary replacement for Otis after he is injured on a call.
 Teddy Sears as Chaplain Kyle Sheffield (seasons 7–8): Orlovsky's replacement as CFD Chaplain. He is briefly engaged to Sylvie Brett from seasons seven to eight.
 Jon-Michael Ecker as Lieutenant Greg Grainger (season 9): a lieutenant from Firehouse 40 temporarily assigned to Engine 51 after Herrmann left on vacation. He briefly casually dates Brett until he realizes she can't commit due to her connection to Casey.
 Chris Mansa as Firefighter Mason Locke, Truck 81 (seasons 9–10), an ex-convict who has firefighter training from his time in prison, but has been rejected from the CFD due to his criminal record. Hermann helps him get a job with a fire department in St. Paul, Minnesota. After he returns to Chicago with his record expunged, Locke is eventually recruited for Truck 81 by Kidd at Herrmann's urging. In the eleventh season premiere, it's revealed he has transferred to a more rural area and is back to fighting wildfires.
 Brett Dalton as Interim Lieutenant Jason Pelham, Truck 81 (season 10), a floater lieutenant brought on to temporarily lead Truck 81 following Casey's departure. He gets off to a rough start with the team, especially with Gallo, they gradually earn each other's respect. Pelham had been stuck in rotation ever since he forced his former captain into retirement. Boden learns the full story and trusts Pelham, but many higher-ups in the department hold a grudge against Pelham, and try to force him out. Firehouse 51 rallies around Pelham, saving his career. He takes the opportunity to transfer and lead a new team, making way for Stella Kidd to take over.
 Jimmy Nicholas as Paramedic Chief Evan Hawkins (seasons 10–11), the chief of Paramedics in the CFD. He grows close to and eventually starts a love affair with Violet Mikami. This later comes back to bite them both when he uses his power to do special favors for her, leading to a strong reprimand from the brass when the affair is discovered, and additional problems later on when conniving and ambitious paramedic Emma Jacobs tries to use her knowledge of it to steal Violet's spot at Firehouse 51, knowing Hawkins can't stop her without ruining both his and Violet's careers. After Hawkins later fires Emma for her own cowardice at a fire, Violet seemingly ends things with him after realizing how much trouble their relationship has caused. However, in the eleventh season premiere, they reconcile after he takes the blame for everything and accepts a transfer to a new district. Tragically, before the transfer becomes official, he is killed in the partial collapse of a burning movie theater while protecting a victim of the fire.
 Caitlin Carver as Paramedic Emma Jacobs, Ambulance 61 (seasons 10–11), a temporary paramedic filling for Brett while she was on furlough. Though she seems to be friendly and gets along with her colleagues at first, she is gradually revealed to have lied about certain details about her life and has a mysterious past that no one in her hometown is legally allowed to discuss. Eventually, it is revealed that she is sabotaging Violet in order to steal her job and permanent spot at 51 for herself, with her going as far as to blackmail Violet's lover Chief Hawkins (with her knowledge of their relationship) into transferring or firing Violet, knowing full well that any attempt by him to protect Violet or retaliate against her could be seen as special treatment by him (which he'd already been reprimanded for by the brass) for Violet, and thus could damage or even end both of their careers. However, when forced to help a pregnant woman deliver in the middle of a fire, Emma panics and abandons the woman, Violet, and other colleagues to save herself, resulting in her immediate termination from 51. It is later revealed in the eleventh season premiere that Hawkins reported her actions to the CFD's top brass, which seemingly resulted in her firing from the department altogether. However, she resurfaces later in the season, having somehow gotten a job in the CFD's Internal Affairs Division. She initially uses her new position to continue her feud with Violet and the rest of 51, until the former finds and shows Hawkins' recorded entries of her blackmail attempts to her boss, which results in her being fired from the CFD altogether again, this time for good.
 Pouch the dog (seasons 1–4): Mills is given a dog by a child from a family who could not take care of it. Herrmann, Chief Boden and Mouch initially decide against it, but eventually agree to let her be adopted by the team. Pouch's name was decided by Herrmann, who suggests that she should be named after Mouch (half man, half couch) as Pouch (half pooch, half couch). In the fourth season, 51 allows her to be adopted by the son of a CPD detective killed in the line of duty to help him with his grief.
 Tuesday the dog (seasons 7–10): A Dalmatian dog belonging to Ritter. She has separation anxiety, so Ritter brings her to the firehouse and she ends up becoming the firehouse dog, replacing Pouch.

Episodes

Crossovers

 "8:30 PM" (Chicago P.D. Season 1, Episode 12) – In the first crossover with P.D., beginning on "A Dark Day", an explosion occurs at Chicago Med, sending the fire and police departments in a race against the clock to find the culprits.
 "Chicago Crossover" (Law & Order: Special Victims Unit Season 16, Episode 7) / "They'll Have to Go Through Me" (Chicago P.D. Season 2, Episode 7) – In the first crossover with P.D. and SVU, beginning on "Nobody Touches Anything", a routine house fire uncovers evidence of a pedophile ring spanning from Chicago to New York.
 "A Little Devil Complex" (Chicago P.D. Season 2, Episode 13) – In the second crossover with P.D., beginning on "Three Bells", Firehouse 51 and Intelligence search for the serial arsonist who killed Leslie Shay.
 "The Number of Rats" (Chicago P.D. Season 2, Episode 20) / "Daydream Believer" (Law & Order: Special Victims Unit Season 16, Episode 20) – In the second crossover with P.D. and SVU, beginning on "We Called Her Jellybean", a fire uncovers evidence of a serial arsonist suspected of committing rape and murder in Chicago and New York.
 "Malignant" (Chicago Med Season 1, Episode 5) / "Now I'm God" (Chicago P.D. Season 3, Episode 10) – In the first crossover with Med and P.D., beginning on "The Beating Heart", a member of Firehouse 51 is rushed to Chicago Med for a stabbing while an attempted suicide uncovers four cases of chemo overdose, leading to an investigation that becomes personal for Voight.
 "Don't Bury This Case" (Chicago P.D. Season 4, Episode 9) – In the third crossover with P.D., beginning on "Some Make It, Some Don't", Severide becomes the prime suspect in a case of vehicular manslaughter.
 "Emotional Proximity" (Chicago P.D. Season 4, Episode 16) / "Fake" (Chicago Justice Season 1, Episode 1) – In the only crossover with P.D. and Justice, beginning on "Deathtrap", the prime suspect in a warehouse fire is put on trial.
 "Profiles" (Chicago P.D. Season 5, Episode 16) – In the fourth crossover with P.D., concluding on "Hiding Not Seeking", Firehouse 51 helps Intelligence investigate a series of bombings targeting members of the media.
 "When to Let Go" (Chicago Med Season 4, Episode 2) / "Endings" (Chicago P.D. Season 6, Episode 2) – In the second crossover with Med and P.D., beginning on "Going to War", the victims of an apartment complex fire are rushed into Chicago Med and Intelligence races to find the culprit.
 "Good Men" (Chicago P.D. Season 6, Episode 15) – In the fifth crossover with P.D., beginning on "What I Saw", Cruz helps Intelligence track down robbers who have been using a firehouse lockbox key.
 "Burden of Truth" (Chicago P.D. Season 7, Episode 15) – In the sixth crossover with P.D., beginning on "Off the Grid", Sean Roman gets involved in the investigation of opioid overdoses connected to his sister.
 "Infection" (Chicago Fire Season 8, Episode 4/Chicago Med Season 5, Episode 4/Chicago P.D. Season 7, Episode 4) – In the third crossover with Med and P.D., a bioterrorist spreads a deadly bacteria throughout Chicago.

Production

Development
The series pilot, co-written by creators Michael Brandt and Derek Haas, was filmed in Chicago and, according to an NBC representative, the series would continue to be filmed there.  Producer John L. Roman was involved from the beginning having worked with the Chicago Fire Department and Deputy District Chief Steve "Chik" Chikerotis on Backdraft. Mayor of Chicago Rahm Emanuel made an appearance in the series' pilot episode.  Emanuel stated: "It's easier being mayor than playing mayor. I told them I'd do it under one condition: the TV show is making an investment to the Firefighters' Widows and Orphans Fund."

The title "Chicago Fire" sparked some confusion in the show's first season due to it duplicating the name of a local professional soccer team, the Chicago Fire Soccer Club (later renamed Chicago Fire FC). Actor Taylor Kinney has said "If you (say) 'We're working on Chicago Fire,' they ask you if you're a soccer player." Producer Dick Wolf hoped that fans of the team might watch the show. The Chicago Fire sports team accepted the shared name and showed the series premiere on October 2, 2012, at Toyota Park after a game with the Philadelphia Union.

The network placed an order for the series in May 2012.  After receiving an additional script order in October, Chicago Fire was picked up for a full season on November 8, 2012.  On January 29, 2013, Chicago Fire had its episode total increased from 22 to 23.  One week later, on February 6, 2013, Chicago Fire received one more episode, giving it a total of 24 episodes for season one. The pilot episode had an early release at NBC.com, before the series' premiere on television.

On November 9, 2015, NBC renewed the series for a fifth season. The season premiered on October 11, 2016.

On May 9, 2018, NBC renewed the series for a seventh season, which premiered on September 26, 2018. On February 26, 2019, NBC renewed the series for an eighth season, which premiered on September 25, 2019. In February 2020, the series was renewed for a ninth, tenth and eleventh season.

Filming
The building used in the show for the firehouse exteriors is a working Chicago Fire Department firehouse, and is the headquarters of Engine 18, located at 1360 South Blue Island Avenue at Maxwell Street, between 13th & Racine. Housed here is ALS Engine 18, 2–2–1 (Deputy District Chief – 1st District), 2–1–21 (1st District Chief), 6–4–16 (High-Rise Response Unit), and ALS Ambulance 65.  The interiors of Firehouse 51 are filmed at Cinespace Chicago Film Studios. The station house used for exteriors in Chicago PD is just a few blocks away at 949 West Maxwell Street at Morgan Street (interiors likewise filmed at Cinespace).

Chicago artist and retired firefighter Lee J. Kowalski's oil paintings of fire scenes can be spotted in several episodes.

Molly's, a small bar owned by Herrmann, Dawson and Mouch, was filmed at Lotties in Bucktown. Filming no longer takes place on location to avoid disrupting business. Instead, the interior and exterior surroundings were recreated at Cinespace.

In November 2012, WGN-TV reported a plane crash at 29th and Martin Luther King Drive on their morning newscast and showed live footage for a few minutes before realizing it was merely a set piece staged for Chicago Fire and not an actual emergency situation.

On March 13, 2020, Universal Television shut down production on the series due to the COVID-19 pandemic.

Production on the series was temporarily halted on September 14, 2022, after a shooting occurred near the set.

Reception

On Metacritic, the first season has a score of 49 out of 100 based on reviews from 23 critics, indicating "mixed or average reviews".

Ratings

Spin-offs

On March 27, 2013, NBC announced plans for a proposed spin-off of Chicago Fire, the police procedural drama Chicago P.D. that would involve the Chicago Police Department, the spin-off series being created and produced by Dick Wolf, with Derek Haas, Michael Brandt, and Matt Olmstead serving as executive producers. It premiered on January 8, 2014.

The show follows an Intelligence Unit of the police and is filmed entirely in Chicago. The main cast includes Jason Beghe, Jon Seda, Sophia Bush, Jesse Lee Soffer, Patrick Flueger, Elias Koteas, Marina Squerciati, LaRoyce Hawkins and Archie Kao.

In February 2015, NBC announced plans to make another spin-off, the medical drama Chicago Med. A special backdoor pilot episode of the show aired during Chicago Fires third season. On May 1, 2015, Chicago Med was officially ordered to a series, starring Oliver Platt, S. Epatha Merkerson, Nick Gehlfuss, Yaya DaCosta, Torrey DeVitto, Rachel DiPillo, Marlyne Barrett, Colin Donnell and Brian Tee. It premiered on November 17, 2015.

Chicago Fire was the first show of what would become the Chicago franchise. Additionally, Chicago P.D. aired a backdoor pilot of the short-lived legal drama series Chicago Justice, which ran from March 1, to May 14, 2017.

Broadcast and streaming
Chicago Fire is broadcast by NBC in the United States. The latest five episodes of Chicago Fire are available on Hulu with a subscription. Season 4 is available on NBC.com and the NBC app with a cable subscription. All episodes are available from electronic sell-through platforms such as iTunes, Amazon Instant Video, and Vudu. The series is available for streaming on Peacock along with Chicago P.D., Chicago Med, Law & Order, Law & Order: Special Victims Unit and Law & Order: Criminal Intent.

In Canada, the series aired on Global for seven seasons, then moved to CityTV.

In Malaysia, the series aired on PRIMEtime for eight seasons, then moved to Universal Channel Asia and AXN asia.

Syndication 
Ion Television has acquired the off-network rights to air the series. Episodes began airing in June 2021. MyNetworkTV also acquired the off-network rights to air the series. Episodes began airing in September 2021.

Awards and nominations

References

External links

  on Wolf Entertainment
  on NBC
 

 
Chicago (franchise)
2012 American television series debuts
2010s American drama television series
2020s American drama television series
2010s American medical television series
2020s American medical television series
2010s American workplace drama television series
2020s American workplace drama television series
Television series by Wolf Films
Television series by Universal Television
Television shows featuring audio description
Chicago Fire Department
Television series about firefighting
Television shows set in Chicago
Television shows set in Illinois